"Dutty Love" is a Latin tropical pop song by Don Omar, also featuring singer Natti Natasha, that was released as the first single from Don Omar's compilation album Don Omar Presents MTO²: New Generation (2012) and in Orfanato Music Group's first mixtape Love is Pain (2011). The song was released digitally on March 9, 2012. The song was nominated for Collaboration and Urban Song of the Year at the Premio Lo Nuestro 2013. It won the Billboard Latin Music Award for Latin Rhythm Airplay Song of the Year in 2013.

Background
Don Omar met Natti Natasha in 2010, when she was recording a song with fellow New York producer Link-On. Don Omar liked her voice and asked her to go back to the studio and congratulate her for her work. As Natasha said, "from the first time he saw me, he told me I'll become a star. It's surreal and I still don't fall in time."

Composition
"Dutty Love" is a mid-tempo reggaeton and pop song with tropical music influences, running at 90 beats per minute. It has core similarities with previous Don Omar single, "Taboo", which also has tropical and Caribbean-influenced beats, but runs at a higher BPM rate.

Charts

Weekly charts

Year-end charts

Decade-end charts

See also
List of Billboard number-one Latin songs of 2012

References

2011 singles
Number-one singles in Colombia
Spanish-language songs
Don Omar songs
Machete Music singles
Universal Music Latino singles
2011 songs
Songs written by Don Omar
Natti Natasha songs